Hosty v. Carter was a 2005 decision by the United States Court of Appeals for the Seventh Circuit that limited the free press rights of college newspapers.

Background
In October 2000, the editor of Governors State University's student newspaper, The Innovator, was told by Dean Patricia Carter to hold future issues until they were approved of by a school administrator, because it had published stories and editorials critical of the administration. This was done despite a policy stating that student newspaper staff would "determine content and format of their respective publications without censorship or advance approval."

Journalists Margaret Hosty, Jeni Porche, and Steven Barba filed suit against the University and Dean Carter in January 2001. A federal district court allowed the case to go forward in November 2001. The school appealed in early 2002.

Holding
The court of appeals held that college newspapers could be subject to the same amount of school control allowed under Hazelwood v. Kuhlmeier (1988) for high school newspapers.

References

External links
 Text of Hosty v. Carter via Google Scholar

United States Free Speech Clause case law
Student rights case law in the United States
Education in Will County, Illinois
Student newspapers published in Illinois